The China women's national under-20 football team represents the People's Republic of China in international football competitions in the FIFA U-20 Women's World Cup and the AFC U-19 Women's Championship, as well as any other under-20 women's international football tournaments. It is governed by the Chinese Football Association.

Honours 
FIFA U-20 Women's World Cup
Runners-up (2): 2004, 2006

AFC U-19 Women's Championship
Winners (1): 2006
Runners-up (1): 2004
Third-places (5): 2002, 2007, 2011, 2013, 2017

Competition history

FIFA U-20 Women's World Cup record
2002: Did not qualify
2004: Runners-up
2006: Runners-up
2008: Group Stage
2010: Did not qualify
2012: Group Stage
2014: Group Stage
2016: Did not qualify
2018: Group Stage
2022: Did not qualify

AFC U-19 Women's Championship record

*Draws include knockout matches decided on penalty kicks.

Recent Matches

2017

2018

Current squad 
Squad for the 2018 FIFA U-20 Women's World Cup

Head Coach:  Peter Bonde

References

External links
 Chinese Football Association Official Website 
 Team China Official Website 
 Profile on FIFA 

under
Asian women's national under-20 association football teams
Youth football in China